Chaelundi National Park, a national park comprising , is located in the Northern Tablelands district of New South Wales, Australia.

Features

The park was proclaimed in January 1997, on land formerly designated as a State-owned production forest.

Litigation
A series of cases were brought in the NSW Land and Environment Court between 1989 and 1991 by members of the North East Forest Alliance in order to protect the forest located near Dorrigo from continued logging. Such were the habitat values of the forest that in Corkill v Forestry Commission, Justice Paul Stein referred to the old growth forest as a "veritable forest dependent zoo". The ruling was that "take" included indirect taking by means of the habitat modification/destruction associated with logging:Corkill v Forestry Commission of New South Wales (1991) 73 LGRA 126. That decision went on appeal to the Court of Appeal, and the interpretation was upheld: Forestry Commission v Corkill (1991) 73 LGRA 247.

These legal cases were combined with an on-site blockade of logging work, the blockade being undertaken by experienced and inexperienced green activists and locals many of whom camped in the forest; using techniques such as chaining protesters inside concrete pipes and up  tripods.

See also

 Protected areas of New South Wales
 Guy Fawkes River National Park
 Boyd River
 Guy Fawkes River
 Sara River
 High Conservation Value Old Growth forest

References 

National parks of New South Wales
Protected areas established in 1997
1997 establishments in Australia
Northern Tablelands